Dr. Kanailal Bhattacharyya ( 1917 - 1983) was an educationist, politician and former minister of Ministry of Commerce & Industries (West Bengal).

Early life
Kanailal Bhattacharyya was born on 12 October 1917 to Sishir Kumar Bhattacharyya, a notable resident of the area and the Bhattacharyya family. From childhood, he lived at Santragachi area. He was early educated in Santragachi Kedarnath Institution, Howrah. He attended Narasinha Dutt College. After that he completed M.Sc. and D.Phil. (Science) degree from Presidency College. He was married to Bani, the daughter of Satyanarayan Biswas.

Political life
Kanailal Bhattacharyya joined All India Forward Bloc. He was connected with the trade union movement in India. So he suffered imprisonment from 1943 to 1945. He became the elected member of the Legislative Assembly at Shibpur in 1972 and 1977 elections.

Educationist
He was a social reformer and educationist. In 1977 he was made the minister of West Bengal Ministry of Commerce and Indrustries. Up to 1993 he was the minister of the department.
A college has been founded and named before him in Howrah naming Dr. Kanailal Bhattacharya College in 1985.

References

1918 births
1983 deaths
People from Howrah
Educators from West Bengal
State cabinet ministers of West Bengal
All India Forward Bloc politicians
Presidency University, Kolkata alumni